The Places of Worship (Special Provisions) Act, 1991 seeks to maintain and protect the religious character of places of worship in India.

References 

Law of India